The Kingdom of Kano was a Hausa kingdom in the north of what is now Nigeria that was established before 1000 AD, and lasted until the proclamation of the Sultanate of Kano by King Ali Yaji Dan Tsamiya in 1349. The capital is now the modern city of Kano in Kano State.

Physical geography
Kano lies to the north of the Jos Plateau, located in the Sudanian Savanna region that stretches across the south of the Sahel. The city lies near where the Kano and Challawa rivers flowing from the southwest converge to form the Hadejia River, which eventually flows into Lake Chad to the east. Traditionally, agriculture was based on lifting water to irrigate small parcels of land along river channels in the dry season, known as the Shadouf system. At the time when the kingdom was flourishing, tree cover would have been more extensive and the soil less degraded than it is today.

History

Background
Our knowledge of the early history of Kano comes largely from the Kano Chronicle, a compilation of oral tradition and some older documents composed in the nineteenth century, as well as more recently conducted archaeology.

In the 7th century, Dala Hill, a hill in Kano, was the site of a community that engaged in iron-working. It is unknown whether these were Hausa people or speakers of Niger–Congo languages.
Some sources say they were Hausa-speaking hunter-gatherers known as Abagayawa who migrated from Gaya.
The Arab geographer al-Yaqubi, writing in 872/873 CE (AH 259), describes a kingdom called "HBShH" with a city named "ThBYR" ruled by a king called "MRH" (none of these words are vocalized, so their actual pronunciation can vary), located between the Niger Bend and the Kingdom of Kanem.  If the kingdom's name is vocalized as "Habasha" it would correspond with other Arabic language texts that also appear to refer to the Hausa, and would be the earliest reference to the Hausa region.

Kano was originally known as Dala, after the hill, and was referred to as such as late as the end of the 15th century and the beginning of the 16th by Bornoan sources.
The Kano Chronicle identifies Barbushe, a priest of a Dala Hill spirit, as the city's first settler. (Elizabeth Isichei notes that the description of Barbushe is similar to those of Sao people.)

Early monarchs

According to the Kano Chronicle, Bagauda, a grandson of the mythical hero Bayajidda, became the first Hausa king of Kano in 999, reigning until 1063.
His grandson Gijimasu (1095–1134), the third king, began building city walls at the foot of Dala Hill, and Gijimasu's son, Tsaraki (1136–1194), the fifth king, completed them during his reign.
The Bagauda family steadily extended the kingdom through conquest of nearby communities.  They established numerous sub-rulers, with titles starting with "Dan", of which the most important was Dan Iya.

Ali Yaji

Ali Yaji (1349–85) presided over the introduction of the Abrahamic religions in Kano. He brought in holy men from Wangara, presumably Mali.  He extended Kano's reach and launched an unsuccessful expedition into the Kwarafa region. He became the last king of Kano when, in the 1350s, after conquering Rano and Santolo, he made Islam the state religion and proclaimed an end to the kingdom. Kano from then on became an Islamic sultanate and its leaders took on the title of Sultan.

See also
List of rulers of Kano
Bagauda Dynasty
Kano Chronicle

References

Sahelian kingdoms
History of Northern Nigeria
10th-century establishments in Africa
14th-century disestablishments in Africa